Capot (1946–1974) was an American Thoroughbred racehorse sired by Menow out of the mare Piquet. Owned and bred by Greentree Stable, Capot was trained by John M. Gaver, Sr.

Two-year-old season 

Racing as a two-year-old, Capot won the Champagne Stakes and the Wakefield Stakes. He capped off the year with his best performance in the prestigious Pimlico Futurity.

Three-year-old season 

At age three, Capot entered the 1949 Kentucky Derby as a 13–1 longshot. Ridden by Ted Atkinson in all the American Triple Crown races, Capot broke from the gate well and was forwardly placed early. He charged to the front of the field on the backstretch and held on willingly  but was unable to withstand the rush from winner Ponder. Easily the best of the rest, he  finished second,  lengths in front of Palestinian.

Then, in the second jewel of the Triple Crown, Capot opened as the 2.5–1 second favorite in the field of ten in the $75,000 Preakness. In that race, all broke well, and Capot sprinted near the lead in second as he passed the stands for the first time. Going into Pimlico's famous clubhouse turn, he was steadied in close quarters but held his position. Just inside the furlong pole coming down the lane, Capot assumed control and drew clear under pressure to stave off the rally of Palestinian and win by a head. It was three more lengths back to Noble Impulse in third,  as favorite Ponder finished fifth. Capot won the Belmont Stakes three weeks later. His performances earned him 1949's Three-Year-Old Male Champion honors. He was also named the 1949 Horse of the Year by the Daily Racing Form but lost the Turf and Sport Digest poll to Coaltown.

Four-year-old season 

At age four, Capot won major stakes races including the 1950 Pimlico Special Handicap at "Old Hilltop" in Baltimore, Maryland. He is one of only four horses to win both of Maryland's top races in the Preakness Stakes and the Pimlico Special. The others were Triple Crown winners: Citation, Assault and Whirlaway. Later that year, Capot also won the Wilson Stakes and finished third in the Fleetwing Handicap to winner Sheilas Reward who broke the track record for six furlongs.

Breeding

References

 Capot's pedigree and racing stats

1946 racehorse births
1974 racehorse deaths
Whitney racehorses
Racehorses bred in the United States
Racehorses trained in the United States
Preakness Stakes winners
Belmont Stakes winners
American Thoroughbred Horse of the Year
Thoroughbred family 5-f